This is a list of physical RF and video connectors and related video signal standards.

By signal standard

Physical connectors

D-subminiature family

DVI-related

DIN/Mini-DIN

Others

See also
Computer display standard

References

External links
Monitor Ports Pinouts and other technical information; lacks more recent interfaces such as HDMI
PC Graphics standard overview Simple table of PC video standards thru XGA with DB9 pinouts
Summary of Video Standards up to XGA
Standard and device-specific video interfaces pinouts  Numerous standards described and categorized, including such recent ones as DVI and HDMI
List of computer video standards and connectors pinouts Wiki format (including community updates and free redistribution); broad coverage including HDMI

Computer display standards
Computing-related lists